Arthur Hardy (15 April 1870 – 1951) was a London born British actor, whose appearances include Atlantic (1929) and Dreyfus (1931).

Filmography
Atlantic (1929) - Maj Boldy
Raise the Roof (1930) - Croxley Bellairs
Dreyfus (1931) - Gen. Mercier
Creeping Shadows (1931) - Sir Edwin Paget
The Great Gay Road (1931) - Sir Crispin
Creeping Shadows (1931)
Other People's Sins (1931)
Abdul the Damned (1935) - Ambassador
The Amazing Quest of Ernest Bliss (1936) - Crawley
The Vulture (1937) - Li Fu

References

External links

BFI

British male film actors
1870 births
1951 deaths
20th-century British male actors
British male stage actors